Guy Laforest  (born 1955) is a Canadian political scientist and former director general of the École nationale d'administration publique. Previous to that he was director of the department of political science at the Université Laval, where he taught for more than 29 years. He was educated at Université Laval and McGill University. A former member of the University of Calgary's political science department, Laforest is the author of numerous publications on Canadian public policy. He has previously served as president of the Canadian Federation for the Humanities and Social Sciences.

Laforest was born in Quebec City, Quebec.

He supported the Quebec sovereignty option in the 1995 referendum and was featured on a nightly Téléjournal panel, debating then–University of Montreal political science professor Stéphane Dion. From 2002 to 2004, he served as President of the Action démocratique du Québec and ran as the party candidate in 2003 for the district of Louis-Hébert, finishing third with 24 per cent of the vote.  Liberal candidate Sam Hamad won the election with 45 per cent of the vote.

Publications

Laforest's publications include:

De la prudence, 1993
Reconciling the Solitudes, 1993
, 1995
, 1998
, 1998

References

External links
 Curriculum vitae
 Texts written by Guy Laforest at www.vigile.net 

1955 births
Living people
Canadian political scientists
Canadian political philosophers
People from Quebec City
Academic staff of Université Laval
Action démocratique du Québec politicians
Canadian political party presidents
Université Laval alumni
McGill University alumni
French Quebecers
Fellows of the Royal Society of Canada